Succinate-semialdehyde dehydrogenase (NADP+) (succinic semialdehyde dehydrogenase (NADP+), succinyl semialdehyde dehydrogenase (NADP+), succinate semialdehyde:NADP+ oxidoreductase, NADP-dependent succinate-semialdehyde dehydrogenase, GabD) is an enzyme with systematic name succinate-semialdehyde:NADP+ oxidoreductase. This enzyme catalyses the following chemical reaction

 succinate semialdehyde + NADP+ + H2O  succinate + NADPH + 2 H+

This enzyme participates in the degradation of glutamate and 4-aminobutyrate.

References

External links 
 

EC 1.2.1